Markus Reiner  (born 5 January 1886, died 25 April 1976) was an Israeli scientist and a major figure in rheology.

Biography 
Reiner was born in 1886 in Czernowitz, Bukovina, then part of Austria-Hungary, and obtained a degree in Civil Engineering at the Technische Hochschule in Vienna (Vienna University of Technology).  After the First World War, he emigrated to Mandatory Palestine, where he worked as a civil engineer under the British mandate.  Reiner married Margalit Obernik and had two children, Ephraim and Hana. He later remarried Dr. Rivka Schoenfeld and had two daughters, Dorit and Shlomit. His granddaughter is Prof. Tal Ilan. After the founding of the state of Israel, he became a professor at the Technion (Israel Institute of Technology) in Haifa.  In his honour the Technion later instituted the Markus Reiner Chair in Mechanics and Rheology.

Research 
Reiner was not only a major figure in rheology, he along with Eugene C. Bingham coined the term and founded a society for its study. As well as the term rheology, and his publications, he is known for the Buckingham-Reiner Equation, the Reiner-Riwlin Equation, and Reiner-Rivlin fluids, the Deborah number and the Teapot effect – an explanation of why tea runs down the outside of the spout of a teapot instead of into the cup.

Awards 
 1958 Israel Prize, in exact science.
 1966 Gold Medal of the British Society of Rheology

See also
List of Israel Prize recipients

References

Primary source
 G. W. Scott-Blair (1976), Rheologica Acta, volume 15 no 7/8, pages 365–266

Further reading
D. Abir (ed) (1975) Contributions to Mechanics: Markus Reiner Eightieth Anniversary Volume: Oxford, Pergamon Press
G. W. Scott Blair & M. Reiner (1957) Agricultural Rheology (Routledge & Kegan Paul, London)
M. Reiner (1960) Deformation, strain and flow: an elementary introduction to rheology: London, H. K. Lewis
M. Reiner (1964) Physics Today volume 17 no 1 page 62 The Deborah Number
M. Reiner (1971) Advanced Rheology: London, H. K. Lewis
M. Reiner (1975) Selected Papers on Rheology: Amsterdam, Elsevier

REINER M (1958) Rheology. Handbuch der Physik, S Flügge (ed.), Vol VI, 434-550, Springer Verlag

1886 births
1976 deaths
Rheologists
Romanian Jews
Romanian emigrants to Mandatory Palestine
Jews in Mandatory Palestine
Israeli civil engineers
Fluid dynamicists
TU Wien alumni
Academic staff of Technion – Israel Institute of Technology
Israel Prize in exact science recipients who were physicists
Members of the Israel Academy of Sciences and Humanities